Vencel Házi (3 September 1925 – 22 January 2007) was a Hungarian diplomat and economist, who served as Hungarian Ambassador to Greece (accredited to Cyprus) 1960 to 1964 to the United Kingdom from 1970 to 1976 and as Hungarian Ambassador to the United States between 1983 and 1989. He also served as Deputy Minister of Foreign Affairs twice (1968–1970 and 1976–1983).

References

Sources

External links
 Diplomatic Representation for Hungary
 Biography of Házi Vencel

1925 births
2007 deaths
People from Békés County
Hungarian Communist Party politicians
Members of the Hungarian Working People's Party
Members of the Hungarian Socialist Workers' Party
Ambassadors of Hungary to the United States
Ambassadors of Hungary to the United Kingdom
Ambassadors of Hungary to Greece
Ambassadors of Hungary to Iraq
Ambassadors of Hungary to Cyprus